Mukul Chowdhury (Bangla:মুকুল চৌধুরী) was a Bangladeshi lyricist and musical artist. He has written many songs for radio, television and more than hundreds of films including 'O Madhobi Go Theko Mor Antore,' 'Tumi Accho Sobi Acche,'  'Ek Chor Jay Chole' etc. He has also penned the song 'Ore Nil Doriya Amay De Re De Chhariya.'

Early life and career 
Chowdhury was born in Balaganj, Sylhet. He lived in the Motijheel AGB Colony, Dhaka. He and Alam Khan used to play football together in the colony field whereafter they became best of friends. Mukul was good at playing vibraphone and he wrote poems too. One day Alam Khan suggested him to write some songs so the next day Mukul wrote some songs and brought it to him. One of them was 'O Madhobi go Theko mor Antore,' which was then composed by Alam Khan and later sang by Rowshan Ara Mustafiz. Through the following time he wrote many other popular songs including 'Bhalobeshe Gelam Shudhu Bhalobasha Pelam Na' for the film Keu Karo Noy, 'Tumi Accho Sobi Acche' for the film Sokhi Tumi Kar and 'Hiramoti Hiramoti' for the film Sareng Bou.

Chowdhury is best known for the lyrics of 'Ore Nil Doriya Amay De Re De Chhariya' which is considered one of the most evergreen compositions of Bangladeshi Music. The music in the song was composed and produced by Alam Khan and sang by Abdul Jabbar for the Bangladeshi film Sareng Bou, directed by Abdullah Al Mamun. In 1976-77 when director Abdullah Al Mamun sat with the songs for his movie, Alam Khan asked Mukul to write something for a music he has already composed in 1969 but did not use anywhere. He read the whole story first and then came up with the lyrics of this famous song within two days.

Death 
Chowdhury went to Kolkata in the year 2002 for his brother's treatment. On 4 April in the same year, he died of a heart attack at a local clinic there.

Remembrance 

The Pancham cultural events at The Central Public Library in Dhaka on 8th May, 2002 was dedicated to Chowdhury. A memorial period was carried out in remembrance of him. A staging called 'Generation's Cry' by the Vocabulary Recitation Academy started after that. Then the music arrangements for the evening began. Chowdhury's son and daughter along with music director, Alam Khan, attended the event.

Film Discography

Non-film songs

References

External links 

 
 Mukul Chowdhury at Bangla Movie Database

Bangladeshi lyricists
Bengali-language lyricists
Bangladeshi radio personalities
Bangladeshi male singers
Bangladeshi folk musicians
Bangladeshi songwriters
Bangladeshi screenwriters
1946 births
2002 deaths